"Saadet" is a Turkish feminine given name, meaning "Felicity." People with this name include:

Given name
Saadet Aksoy (born 1983), Turkish-born actress
Saadet I Giray (1492–1538), Khan of the Crimean Khanate
Saadet II Giray (?–1587), Khan of the Crimean Khanate
 Saadet İkesus Altan (1916–2007), Turkish opera singer, vocal coach and opera director
Saadet Özkan (born 1978), Turkish activist against child abuse
Saadet Yüksel (born 1983), Turkish judge at the European Court of Human Rights

Other uses
Felicity Party, an Islamist Turkish political party

Turkish given names